Helmuth Günther Guddat Hübener (8 January 1925 – 27 October 1942) was a German youth who was executed at age 17 by beheading for his opposition to the Nazi regime. He was the youngest person of the German resistance to Nazism to be sentenced to death by the Sondergericht ("special court") People's Court (Volksgerichtshof) and executed.

Life
Helmuth Hübener, born in Hamburg on 8 January 1925, came from an apolitical, religious family in Hamburg, Germany. He belonged to the Church of Jesus Christ of Latter-day Saints (LDS Church), as did his mother and grandparents. His adoptive father, Hugo, a Nazi sympathizer, gave him the name Hübener.

Since early childhood, Hübener had been a member of the Boy Scouts, an organization strongly supported by the LDS Church, but in 1935 the National Socialists banned scouting from Germany. He then joined the Hitler Youth, as required by the government, but quit after the Kristallnacht in 1938, when the Nazis, including the Hitler Youth, destroyed Jewish businesses and homes.

When one of the leaders in his local congregation undertook to ban Jews from attending its religious services, Hübener found himself at odds with the new policy, but continued to attend services with like-minded friends as the Latter-day Saints locally debated the issue. His friend and fellow resistance fighter Rudolf "Rudi" Wobbe later reported that of the 2,000 Latter-day Saints in the Hamburg area, only seven were pro-Nazi, but five of them happened to be in his and Hübener's St. Georg Branch (congregation), thus stirring controversy with the majority who were non- or anti-Nazis.

After Hübener finished middle school in 1941, he began an apprenticeship in administration at the Hamburg Social Authority (Sozialbehörde). He met other apprentices there, one of whom, Gerhard Düwer, he would later recruit into his resistance movement. At a bathhouse, he met new friends, one of whom had a communist family background and, as a result, he began listening to enemy radio broadcasts. Listening to foreign media was at the time strictly forbidden in Nazi Germany, being considered a form of treason. In the summer of that same year, Hübener discovered his older half-brother Gerhard's shortwave radio in a hallway closet. It had been given to Gerhard earlier that year by a soldier returning from service in France. Helmuth began listening to the BBC on his own, and he used what he heard to compose various anti-National Socialist texts and anti-war leaflets, of which he also made many copies. The leaflets were designed to bring to people's attention how skewed the official reports about World War II from Berlin were, as well as to point out Adolf Hitler's, Joseph Goebbels', and other leading Nazis' criminal behaviour. Other themes covered by Hübener's writings were the war's futility and Germany's looming defeat. He also mentioned the mistreatment sometimes meted out in the Hitler Youth.

In one of his pamphlets, for example, he wrote:

In late 1941, his listening involved three friends: Karl-Heinz Schnibbe and Rudi Wobbe, both of whom were fellow Latter-day Saints, and later Gerhard Düwer. Hübener had them help him distribute about 60 different pamphlets, all containing typewritten material from the British broadcasts. They distributed them throughout Hamburg, using such methods as surreptitiously pinning them on bulletin boards, inserting them into letterboxes, and stuffing them in coat pockets.

Arrest and execution
On 5 February 1942, Hübener was arrested by the Gestapo at his workplace, the Hamburg Social Authority in the Bieberhaus in Hamburg. While trying to translate the pamphlets into French and have them distributed among prisoners of war, he had been noticed by co-worker and Nazi Party member Heinrich Mohn, who denounced him.

On 11 August 1942, aged 17, Hübener was tried as an adult by the Special People's Court (Volksgerichtshof) in Berlin, which had jurisdiction over matters of treason. Hübener was sentenced to death. After the sentence was read, Hübener faced the judges and said: "Now I must die, even though I have committed no crime. So now it's my turn, but your turn will come." He hoped his confrontational tactics would focus the judge's wrath on him and spare his companions.

As stated in the proclamation, Hübener was found guilty of conspiracy to commit high treason and treasonous furthering of the enemy's cause. He was sentenced not only to death, but also to permanent loss of his civil rights, which meant the prison guards were allowed to torture and abuse him, and he was not allowed bedding or blankets in his cold cell.

It was highly unusual for the Nazis to try an underaged defendant, much less sentence him to death, but the court stated that Hübener had shown more than average intelligence for a boy his age. This, along with his general and political knowledge, and his behaviour before the court, made Hübener, in the court's eyes, a boy with a far more developed mind than was usually to be found in someone of his age. For this reason, the court stated, Hübener was to be punished as an adult.

Hübener's lawyers, his mother, and the Berlin Gestapo appealed for clemency in his case, hoping to have his sentence commuted to life imprisonment. In their eyes, the fact that Hübener had confessed fully and shown himself to be still morally uncorrupted were points in his favour. The Reich Youth Leadership (Reichsjugendführung) disagreed, however, and stated that the danger posed by Hübener's activities to the German people's war effort made the death penalty necessary. On 27 October 1942, the Nazi Ministry of Justice upheld the Special People's Court verdict. Hübener was only told of the Ministry's decision at 1:05 PM on the scheduled day of execution.

On 27 October, at 8:13 PM, he was beheaded by guillotine in the execution room at Plötzensee Prison in Berlin. His two friends, Schnibbe and Wobbe, who had also been arrested, were given prison sentences of five and ten years respectively.

Church reaction

In 1937, the president of the LDS Church, Heber J. Grant, had visited Germany and urged the members to remain, get along, and not cause trouble. Consequently, some church members saw Hübener as a troublemaker who made things difficult for other Latter-day Saints in Germany. This recommendation did not change after Kristallnacht, which occurred the year following Grant's visit, after which he evacuated all non-German Latter-day Saint missionaries.

The local Latter-day Saint branch president, Arthur Zander (1907-1989), was a supporter of the Nazi Party, and had affixed a notice to the meetinghouse entrance stating "Jews not welcome". Ten days after the arrest of Hübener, on 15 February 1942, Zander claimed to have excommunicated the young man. The excommunication was also signed by the European mission president and many other leaders voiced their support.

The day of his execution, Hübener wrote to a fellow branch member, "I know that God lives and He will be the Just Judge in this matter… I look forward to seeing you in a better world!" (excerpt from a letter written by Hübener, the only one believed to still exist).

In 1946, four years later and after the war, Hübener was posthumously reinstated into the LDS Church by the new mission president, Max Zimmer, saying the excommunication was not carried through with the proper procedures. He was also posthumously rebaptized, ordained an elder, and endowed in 1948 to clarify that his membership in the church was never in doubt.

Legacy

A youth centre, school and a pathway in Hamburg are named after Helmuth Hübener. The last runs between Greifswalder Straße and Kirchenweg in Sankt Georg. At the former Plötzensee Prison in Berlin, an exhibit about young Helmuth Hübener's resistance, trial, and execution was located in the former guillotine chamber that has since been changed to highlight other victims.  Floral tributes are often placed in memory of Hübener and others put to death by the Nazis there. Helmuth Hübener also has a Stolperstein, which can be found at Sachsenstraße 42 in Hamburg-Hammerbrook.

On 8 January 1985, sixty years after Hübener's birth, ceremonies in his memory were held in Hamburg by city officials. His fellow resisters, Schnibbe and Wobbe, both of whom had emigrated to the U.S. after the war, returned to Hamburg for the commemoration, where they were honored guests and speakers.

Depiction in books, drama and film
Hübener's story has been the subject of various literary, dramatic, and cinematic works. In 1970, German author Günter Grass published the book Local Anaesthetic, about the Hübener group.

In 1979 Thomas F. Rogers, a university teacher at Brigham Young University, wrote a play titled Huebener, which has had several runs in various venues. Hübener's two co-accused friends, Karl-Heinz Schnibbe and Rudi Wobbe, attended some of the performances, albeit in different circumstances. Wobbe died of cancer in 1992; Schnibbe died in 2010. In February 2014, Huebener made its high school premiere in St. George, Utah.

In 1995, the first-hand account When Truth Was Treason was published, narrated by Karl-Heinz Schnibbe and written by Blair R. Holmes, a professional historian, and Alan F. Keele, a German-language specialist. A newer edition was published in 2003 (see ).

The book Hübener Vs. Hitler by Richard Lloyd , is, in this revised and expanded edition, a biography written in a popular-historical style. It includes interviews with all then-living friends and close relatives of Hübener. It also utilizes primary investigative documents from the Nazi era.

Rudolf Gustav Wobbe (Hübener's other co-resistance fighter) wrote the book Before the Blood Tribunal. Published in 1989, the book provides a personal account of his own trial before the Special People's court of Nazi Germany where he was sentenced to 10 years in prison for his participation in anti-Nazi resistance. Rudi, as he was known, also describes events leading up to the trials of the three German youths and his own experience as a prisoner. This book was later republished as Three Against Hitler.

The 2008 juvenile novel The Boy Who Dared by Susan Campbell Bartoletti, while fictional, is based on Hübener's life. Bartoletti's earlier Newbery Honor book, Hitler Youth: Growing Up in Hitler's Shadow (2005), also covers Hübener's story.

Hübener's story was documented in the 2003 documentary Truth & Conviction, written and directed by Rick McFarland and Matt Whitaker.

The story was also depicted in Resistance Movement, an independent 2012 film.

See also
List of peace activists

Notes

References
 
 Gedenkstätte Plötzensee (Brigitte Oleschinski, published by the Gedenkstätte Deutscher Widerstand, and also listed in the German article).
 
 Review of Ulrich Sander's book Jugendwiderstand im Krieg. Die Helmuth-Hübener-Gruppe.
 The Price: The True Story of a Mormon Who Defied Hitler, by Karl-Heinz Schnibbe, with Alan F. Keele and Douglas F. Tobler. Salt Lake City: Bookcraft, 1984. (This book was the first "rough" pp and considerably shorter version of the later expanded and revised title, When Truth Was Treason).

External links
Alan Frank Keele papers, MSS 7726 at L. Tom Perry Special Collections, Brigham Young University. Contains research notes on Hübener.

1925 births
1942 deaths
Executed children
People excommunicated by the Church of Jesus Christ of Latter-day Saints
People from Hamburg executed at Plötzensee Prison
German anti-fascists
German Latter Day Saints
Executed German Resistance members
World War II resistance movements
People executed by guillotine at Plötzensee Prison
Hitler Youth members